Maripa is a genus of flowering plants belonging to the family Convolvulaceae.

Its native range is Southeastern Mexico to Southern Tropical America.

Species:

Maripa axilliflora 
Maripa densiflora 
Maripa elongata 
Maripa fasciculata 
Maripa glabra 
Maripa janusiana 
Maripa lewisii 
Maripa longifolia 
Maripa nicaraguensis 
Maripa panamensis 
Maripa paniculata 
Maripa pauciflora 
Maripa peruviana 
Maripa putumayana 
Maripa repens 
Maripa reticulata 
Maripa scandens 
Maripa stellulata 
Maripa violacea 
Maripa williamsii

References

Convolvulaceae
Convolvulaceae genera